Fleetwood Mac, also known as Peter Green's Fleetwood Mac, is the debut studio album by British blues rock band Fleetwood Mac, released on 24 February 1968. The album is a mixture of blues covers and originals penned by guitarists Peter Green and Jeremy Spencer, who also share the vocal duties. It is the only album by the band without any involvement of keyboardist/vocalist Christine McVie.

The release of the album brought the band overnight success; in the UK, the album reached No. 4 and stayed on the charts 37 weeks, despite the lack of a hit single. The album barely made the charts in the US, reaching No. 198. Even though the album has sold over a million copies in the UK, it has never received a certification there. As of June 2015, the album has sold over 150,000 copies in the US.

An expanded version of this album was included in the box set The Complete Blue Horizon Sessions.

Background
On 19 April 1967, John Mayall, the frontman of John Mayall & the Bluesbreakers, gave his bandmate Peter Green free studio time at Decca Studios in West Hampstead, London, to use as he wished. Four songs came out of the recording sessions, one of them being an instrumental called "Fleetwood Mac", named after the rhythm section, Mick Fleetwood and John McVie. The other three songs recorded that day were "First Train Home", "Looking for Somebody" and "No Place to Go". After the session, Green approached Fleetwood and McVie with the idea of forming a new band. While Fleetwood, who had been fired from The Bluesbreakers, was willing to join immediately, McVie was hesitant. Green advertised in Melody Maker for a temporary bassist in the hope that McVie would eventually join as a full-time member. Bob Brunning answered the ad and was told the band would play at the Windsor Jazz & Blues Festival in a month.

While searching for new bands to add to the Blue Horizon roster, producer Mike Vernon came across a demo tape of the Levi Set Blues Set, a band formed by guitarist Jeremy Spencer. After Vernon played Green a demo tape of the band to showcase Spencer's guitar playing, Green travelled to a Levi Set gig in Lichfield where he successfully recruited Spencer for Fleetwood Mac.

By the time of the Windsor Festival, Green had already gained recognition for replacing guitarist Eric Clapton in John Mayall's Bluesbreakers, which helped boost the band's profile. Shortly after Fleetwood Mac's live debut, McVie left the Bluesbreakers following Mayall's decision to add a horn section to the lineup. McVie subsequently joined Fleetwood Mac, replacing Brunning.

Reception and legacy
The album sold well in the UK, reaching number four on the British charts. Upon release, Barry Gifford (writing for Rolling Stone) praised the album, and described it as "potent enough to make the South Side of Chicago take notice".

Modern attitudes to the album are also largely positive, and many critics argue the album is one of the highlights of the British blues bloom. TeamRock describes it as a "marvellous debut that established the group as the best British blues band of the day". Writing for Ultimate Classic Rock, Nick DeRiso described the album as a "stellar debut" and "maybe the best album from the British blues boom". He also ranked it as the 4th greatest Fleetwood Mac album. The Telegraph has described the album as a "classic sixties London 12-bar blues rock debut", while also calling it "raw, physical, high spirited and blessed with the exceptional playing of Peter Green". The Encyclopedia of Popular Music describes the album as "seminal".

Accolades
"ThoughtCo." described the album as an " inspired mix of blues covers", and placed it in the top 10 "The Best Blues-Rock Albums of the 1960s". "Guitarist" (UK magazine) placed the album in "101 Essential Guitar Albums", and John Tobler considered the album to be one of the "100 Great Albums of the 60s".

It was voted number 435 in Colin Larkin's All Time Top 1000 Albums.

Track listing

Note
Asterisk (*) denotes a bonus track

Personnel
Fleetwood Mac
Mick Fleetwood – Drums
Peter Green – Lead vocals ("Merry Go Round", "Long Grey Mare", "Looking for Somebody", "No Place to Go", "I Loved Another Woman", "The World Keep On Turning"), electric guitar, harmonica
Jeremy Spencer – lead vocals ("My Heart Beat Like a Hammer", "Hellhound on my Trail", "Shake Your Moneymaker", "My Baby's Good to Me", "Cold Black Night", "Got to Move"), slide guitar, piano
John McVie – Bass guitar on all tracks except "Long Grey Mare", "Hellhound on My Trail" and "The World Keep on Turning"
Bob Brunning – Bass guitar on "Long Grey Mare"

Charts

References

External links
"British Hit Albums" Paul Gambaccini, Tim Rice, Jonathan Rice (Guinness Publishing, 5th edition, 1992)

1968 debut albums
Albums produced by Mike Vernon (record producer)
Blue Horizon Records albums
Fleetwood Mac albums